William S. Greenberg (born December 2, 1942) is an American lawyer who serves as a judge of the United States Court of Appeals for Veterans Claims. Previously he was a New Jersey attorney in private practice.

Biography

Greenberg was born in 1942. He received his Bachelor of Arts degree in 1964 from Johns Hopkins University. He received his Juris Doctor in 1967 from Rutgers University School of Law in Newark. He served in the United States Army Reserve for 27 years, rising to the rank of Brigadier General.

Greenberg was a partner of McCarter & English, LLP. He initially joined the firm as an associate following a judicial clerkship in 1968, then returned as a partner in 1993. The majority of his career has involved litigation in federal and state courts.

Greenberg had been a Certified Civil Trial Attorney by the Supreme Court of New Jersey since 1983.  He was president of the Association of Trial Lawyers of America, New Jersey, (The New Jersey Association for Justice) and has served as trustee of the New Jersey State Bar Association and of the New Jersey State Bar Foundation. He also served as a member of the New Jersey Supreme Court Committee on the Admission of Foreign Attorneys. He established and chaired the New Jersey State Bar Association (public service/pro bono) program of military legal assistance for members of the Reserve Components called to active duty after September 11, 2001. He was a member of the New Jersey Supreme Court Civil Practice Committee. With the approval of the Secretary of Defense, on the recommendation of The White House, Greenberg became chairman of the Reserve Forces Policy Board in 2009, a board established by the Secretary of Defense in 1951 and by Act of Congress in 1952. On July 26, 2011, Greenberg was awarded the Secretary of Defense Medal for Outstanding Public Service, the second highest civilian award in the Defense Department, at a public ceremony in the Pentagon, and completed his term in August 2011.

In 2006 his Civil Trial Handbook, Volume 47 of the New Jersey Practice Series, was published by Thomson/West. A special Twentieth Anniversary issue was published in 2009, to commemorate the 1989 publication of its predecessor, Trial Handbook for New Jersey Lawyers.

A retired brigadier general, he served as a member of the New Jersey World War II Memorial Commission. In June 2009 he received the highest honor granted by the New Jersey State Bar Foundation, its medal of honor for his work in establishing the military legal assistance program, and especially in his public service representation of soldiers at Walter Reed Army Medical Center during their Physician Disability Hearings. His article in the June 2007 issue of New Jersey Lawyer Magazine describes the program in detail. He has served as special litigation counsel to The Adjutants General Association of the United States and was special litigation counsel pro bono to the National Guard Association of the United States.

Greenberg was a commissioner of the New Jersey State Commission of Investigation. He also served as assistant counsel to the governor of New Jersey and as commissioner of the New Jersey State Scholarship Commission.

Greenberg served as the first adjunct professor of military law at the Seton Hall University School of Law.  Currently, he serves as an adjunct professor at Georgetown University Law Center.

He was chosen the New Jersey Lawyer Of The Year for 2009 by The New Jersey Law Journal. He received The Distinguished Alumnus Award from Johns Hopkins University in 2010, and the Rutgers Law School Public Service Award in 2010 for his work in developing and leading the efforts to represent wounded and injured soldiers at Walter Reed.

Greenberg is admitted in New Jersey, New York and the District of Columbia. He is a member of the bar of the Supreme Court of the United States, and of the Third, Fourth and Federal Circuits, the Southern District of New York, and the United States Court of Appeals for the Armed Forces.

He is married to the former Betty Kaufmann Wolf of Pittsburgh. They have three children, Katherine of New York, Anthony of Baltimore, and Elizabeth of New York.

Court of Appeals service

On November 15, 2012, President Barack Obama nominated Greenberg to serve as a United States Judge for the United States Court of Appeals for Veterans Claims. The office is an Article I judgeship, with a fifteen-year term appointment. The Senate confirmed his nomination by unanimous consent on December 21, 2012.  On December 27, 2012, he was commissioned by the president and took the judicial oath on December 28, 2012.

References

1942 births
Living people
Johns Hopkins University alumni
Judges of the United States Court of Appeals for Veterans Claims
New Jersey lawyers
Seton Hall University School of Law faculty
United States Article I federal judges appointed by Barack Obama
21st-century American judges
Place of birth missing (living people)